Bill "Bunky" Sheppard (20 March 1922 in New Orleans – 1 July 1997 in Los Angeles) was an American, Chicago-based music promoter and music producer of the 1950s and 1960s, who eventually became Vice President of 20th Century Fox Records (1978-1992). He promoted such groups as The Esquires ("Get on Up", "And Get Away", and "Girls in the City"), The Sheppards and others.

Discography
"Burnin'", The Bill Sheppard Combo on Ewart Abner's Abner Records

References

1922 births
1997 deaths
American music industry executives
Record producers from Louisiana
20th-century American businesspeople